Southborough is a town in Worcester County, Massachusetts, United States. It incorporates the villages of Cordaville, Fayville, and Southville. Its name is often informally shortened to Southboro, a usage seen on many area signs and maps, though officially rejected by town ordinance. At the 2020 census, its population was 10,450 in 3,542 households.

In 2021, 43% of land use is residential, with 35% open space, including a tenth of the town's area that is flooded by the Sudbury Reservoir. Light industrial land use is concentrated along main roads, primarily Massachusetts Route 9, and there are several small business districts in the villages and along Route 9.

History
Southborough was first settled in 1660 and was officially incorporated in July 1727. Southborough was primarily a farming community until mills began to tap the small rivers that ran through the town. By the end of the 19th century, Southborough was home to the manufacture of plasters, straw bonnets, boots, and shoes, among other things.

In 1727, Southborough split off as the "south borough" of Marlborough, much as Westborough had split off from Marlborough in 1717, ten years before.

In 1898, the Fayville Dam was constructed to produce several reservoirs to supply a growing Boston with water. As a result, manufacturing vanished, and Southborough did not see substantial growth until the high-tech boom of the 1970s.

The Fay, Burnett, and Choate families had major impacts on the development of the town as it is today. St. Mark's Church, St. Mark's School, the Southborough Library, the Community House, and the Fay School were all built at least in part through the efforts of these families.

Geography

Demographics

By the census of 2010, the population had reached 9,767.

As of the census of 2000, there were 8,781 people, 2,952 households, and 2,426 families residing in the town. The racial makeup of the town was 94.47% White, 0.54% African American, 0.07% Native American, 3.52% Asian, 0.05% Pacific Islander, 0.50% from other races, and 0.87% from two or more races. Hispanic or Latino of any race were 1.50% of the population.

There were 2,952 households, out of which 47.5% had children under the age of 18 living with them, 73.9% were married couples living together, 6.0% had a female householder with no husband present, and 17.8% were non-families. 14.0% of all households were made up of individuals, and 5.5% had someone living alone who was 65 years of age or older. The average household size was 2.97, and the average family size was 3.30.

In the town, the population was spread out, with 32.1% under the age of 18, 3.7% from 18 to 24, 32.2% from 25 to 44, 23.9% from 45 to 64, and 8.1% who were 65 years of age or older. The median age was 37 years. For every 100 females, there were 99.9 males. For every 100 females age 18 and over, there were 95.2 males.

The median income for a household in the town was $132,986, and the median income for a family was $129,454, although according to CNN, median family income had risen to $148,297 by 2009. Males had a median income of $80,961 versus $50,537 for females. The per capita income for the town was $64,310. About 0.4% of families and 0.6% of the population were below the poverty line, including 0.7% of those under age 18 and 4.5% of those age 65 or over.

Economy 
Information technology services company Virtusa is based in Southborough.

Arts and culture
Points of interest in Southborough are:
 9/11 Field
 Arts Center
 Community House
 Rural Cemetery
 Breakneck Hill conservation land
 Sudbury Reservoir Trail
 St. Mark's School
 Beals Preserve
 Pilgrim Congregational Church, where the funeral scene from the movie "Grown Ups" was filmed
 Boroughs Loop Trail

Annual events
Southborough celebrates Heritage Day on Columbus Day.  Events include a parade with the Algonquin High School marching band.  Events in the week prior include a run/walk event and pumpkin-carving.

Library
The public library in Southborough was established in 1852. In fiscal year 2008, the town of Southborough spent 0.95% ($370,390) of its budget on its public library—approximately $38 per person, per year ($50.07 adjusted for inflation to 2022).

Government
The form of town government is open town meeting, in which the voters of the town assemble as the legislature. Each Town Meeting is managed by the elected Moderator, who also appoints most of the membership of the unelected boards.

The five members of the Select Board are elected to act as the executive body of the government. The Select Board delegates day-to-day operations to the Town Administrator.

Southborough has three school committees:
 Southborough K–8 School Committee
 Northborough-Southborough Regional School Committee
 Assabet Valley Regional Vocational-Technical School Committee

Southborough's town elections are non-partisan.

Almost sixty percent of current voters registered without enrolling in any political party. Democrats slightly outnumber Republicans in the remaining forty percent. Minor party enrollments are negligible.

The State Senator is Jamie Eldridge; the U.S. Representative is Katherine Clark; and the U.S. Senators are Elizabeth Warren and Ed Markey.

Education

Public and private educational campuses frame Southborough's downtown.

Public schools
Southborough has six public schools. The four elementary and middle schools are inside town limits; the two high schools are regional schools in adjoining towns.
Mary E. Finn School – Preschool, kindergarten, and 1st grade
Albert S. Woodward School – 2nd and 3rd grade
Margaret A. Neary School – 4th and 5th grade
P. Brent Trottier Middle School – 6th, 7th, and 8th grade
Algonquin Regional High School in Northborough, Massachusetts – 9th to 12th
Assabet Valley Regional Technical High School in Marlborough, Massachusetts – 9th to 12th

Private schools

Southborough is home to a private secondary school, St. Mark's, which was founded in 1865 by Joseph Burnett. The oldest junior boarding school in the nation, the Fay School, was founded a year later in 1866 by Joseph Burnett's first cousin Harriet Burnett Fay.

Media
 My Southborough news blog

Infrastructure

Transportation
The MBTA Commuter Rail's Framingham/Worcester Line train stops at Southborough Station, which opened to commuters on June 22, 2002. The station is located in the Cordaville neighborhood, on Route 85 near the border with Hopkinton. As of October 2007, ten daily round-trip trains provide service to Boston via the Back Bay and South Station terminals.

Interstate 495 and the Massachusetts Turnpike (Interstate 90) both pass through Southborough, although neither have interchanges within town limits. Routes 9 and 30 are east-west routes passing through Southborough, while Route 85 serves the town as a north-south route.

Notable people

 Marty Barrett, former Red Sox second baseman, who now resides in Las Vegas
 Doug Brown, former National Hockey League forward
 Ryan Gallant, professional skateboarder
 John Garabedian, radio personality
 Winfield Scott Hammond (1863–1915), Congressman, Governor of Minnesota from January 5, to December 30, 1915
 Jeffrey Johnson, actor
 Storm Large, musician and actress
 Warner Oland (1879–1938), actor and star of sixteen 'Charlie Chan' movies from 1931–1937
 Rico Petrocelli, former Red Sox third baseman
 Mike Port, former Red Sox General Manager and executive
 E. C. Spykman (1896–1965), children's novelist and journalist
 Robert H. Thayer (1901–1984), lawyer, naval officer and diplomat
 Luis Tiant, former Red Sox pitcher
 Michael Weishan, former PBS host

See also
Greater Boston
MetroWest
Open town meeting format

References

External links

Southborough official website

 
MetroWest
Populated places established in 1660
Towns in Worcester County, Massachusetts
1660 establishments in Massachusetts
Towns in Massachusetts